An engine is a device that converts one form of energy into mechanical energy.

Engine may also refer to:

Thermodynamics
 Heat engine, a physical or theoretical device that converts thermal energy to mechanical output
 Reciprocating engine, a heat engine that uses one or more pistons
 Internal combustion engine, an engine in which the combustion of fuel and an oxidizer occurs in a confined space
 Diesel engine
 Wankel engine, a type of internal combustion engine
 Pulse jet engine, an internal combustion engine wherein the combustion occurs in pulses
 External combustion engine, an engine where an internal fluid is heated through the engine wall or a heat exchanger
 Steam engine, an external combustion engine that converts steam expansion into mechanical work
 Carnot heat engine, a hypothetical engine that operates on the reversible Carnot cycle
 Stirling engine, a closed-cycle regenerative hot-air engine

Rail transport
 Locomotive, the car of a train that carries the actual engine(s) and pulls/pushes the rest of the train
 Electric locomotive, a locomotive which carries the electric motors of a train

Computing

Software engines
 Software engine, a core component of a complex software system
 Browser engine, component of a web browser that renders web pages on a screen
 Chess engine, software that analyzes a chess game and makes decisions
 Database engine, software that manipulates database contents internally
 Game engine, the core software component of a video game
 JavaScript engine, component of a web browser that executes the page's JavaScript code
 Polymorphic engine or mutation engine, a common component of malware
 Search engine, an Internet service that provides information and links to relevant websites

Other
 Engine (computer science), a construct providing timed preemption
 Analytical Engine, a concept for a computer, designed by Charles Babbage
 Difference engine, a mechanical calculator designed to tabulate polynomial functions

Literature
 The Engine, a fictional device described in Gulliver's Travels
 Engines (book), a 1959 science book for children by L. Sprague de Camp

Music
Engine (British band), a British boogie-rock band, active between 1979 and 1997
Engine (American band), an American metal band fronted by Ray Alder
Engine (Engine album), the band's 1999 debut album
Engine (American Music Club album), 1987
Engine (Jinn album), 2010
Engine (Loudness album), 1999
 "Engine", a song by Luminous from Luminous in Wonderland, 2022

Television
 Engine (TV series), a Japanese television drama starring Takuya Kimura
 Engines (Engine Sentai Go-onger), fictional machines in the TV series Engine Sentai Go-onger

Other uses
 Engine (organization), an American nonprofit organization encouraging high-tech entrepreneurship
 Fire engine, a vehicle used by firefighters
 Siege engine, an anti-fortification machine or structure

See also
 Motor (disambiguation), a device which converts electrical or hydraulic energy into motion
 Fire apparatus, a vehicle used to assist in fighting fires
 ingen (disambiguation)
 NGEN (disambiguation)
 Template engine (disambiguation)